Fentons Creek is a small town in Victoria, Australia. It is located near Wedderburn in the Loddon Shire. A creek with the same name runs along the edge of the township. At the 2006 census, the suburb had a population of 115.

The town covers a large area. At a central spot there is a Country Fire Authority station/shed, a chapel and an old schoolhouse that is no longer used. The chapel is struggling to stay open but still holds services with a priest from Heathcote because of supportive locals.

Gallery

References

Towns in Victoria (Australia)
Shire of Loddon
Mining towns in Victoria (Australia)